Ronald Marquez de Santos Jr. (born May 15, 1998), known professionally as Kokoy de Santos, is a Filipino actor, singer, dancer, commercial model, and comedian. His movie Fuccbois was an official entry to the 15th Cinemalaya Philippine Independent Film Festival that gave him a break in to acting.

In May 2020, he was cast as one of the main actors in the web series Gameboys. Produced by The IdeaFirst Company, it is a boys love (BL) series in the Philippines that tackles the story of two young boys who found each other online amidst the COVID-19 pandemic. Santos plays the role of Gavreel Alarcon alongside Elijah Canlas who plays the role of Cairo Lazaro, a famous online game streamer, in the thirteen-part series.

Filmography

Web series

Television

Film

Awards and nominations

References

External links 

 
 Sparkle GMA Artist Center profile

1998 births
Living people
Filipino male television actors
Filipino male film actors
21st-century Filipino male actors
Filipino male comedians
GMA Network personalities
ABS-CBN personalities
TV5 (Philippine TV network) personalities
Participants in Philippine reality television series